The Ambassador of Switzerland to Australia is an officer of the Swiss Federal Department of Foreign Affairs and the head of the Embassy of the Swiss Confederation to the Commonwealth of Australia. The position has the rank and status of an Ambassador Extraordinary and Plenipotentiary and holds non-resident accreditation for Kiribati, Nauru, Papua New Guinea, the Solomon Islands and Vanuatu. The ambassador is based with the embassy in Forrest in Canberra.

The Ambassador is currently Caroline Bichet-Anthamatten. Switzerland and Australia have enjoyed diplomatic relations since 1961, although consular representation has existed even before in Australia and its previous colonies: in Sydney since 1855, Melbourne since 1856, Brisbane since 1889, Adelaide since 1879 and consular agencies in Darwin (1978), Hobart (1968) and Perth (1971).

Ambassadors, 1961–present

Consuls and consuls-general

Consuls in Sydney, 1855–present

Consuls in Melbourne, 1856–present

Consuls in Adelaide

Consuls in Brisbane

Consuls in Perth

See also
Australia–Switzerland relations
Foreign relations of Switzerland
List of Australian Ambassadors to Germany (accredited to Switzerland)

References

External links
Switzerland and Australia

 
Switzerland
Switzerland
Australia